Operation Hydra was a failed British attempt during World War II in Yugoslavia to develop contact with the Partisans led by Josip Broz Tito, in Montenegro in February 1942.

Two British Special Operations Executive agents and an officer of the former Royal Yugoslav Air Force were put ashore at Perazića Do, just north of Petrovac.

On 4 February the three agents went ashore from the British submarine HMS Thorn. They were Major Terence Atherton (a former journalist and agent in Belgrade), Lieutenant Radoje Nedeljković of the Yugoslav Royal Air Force and Sergeant Patrick O'Donovan, wireless operator.

The operation failed completely. The presence of the Yugoslav officer implied links to the royalist Chetniks, which is suggested to have caused Tito to suspect the British of being spies. Nothing beneficial arose, therefore, and the British agents left Tito. They vanished soon thereafter, as did the large amount of gold and Italian money that they carried.

British liaison officer at Mihailović's headquarters Duane "Bill" Hudson prompted Mihailović to order a formal inquiry into the fate of the Atherton mission. A summary of the results of this investigation was sent by Hudson to SOE office in Cairo. According to the results of the inquiry, the most probable culprit for Atherton's death was četnik leader Spasoje Dakić.

Citations

References
 

Hydra
Yugoslavia in World War II
United Kingdom–Yugoslavia relations
Conflicts in 1942
February 1942 events
1942 in Yugoslavia
Balkans campaign (World War II)